Rosie Ledet (born Mary Roszela Bellard; October 25, 1971) is an American Creole Zydeco accordion player and singer.

Her songs are known for their sultry and suggestive lyrics. She tours and records with her band, the Zydeco Playboys.

Biography 
Born in Church Point, Louisiana, Ledet listened to rock music in her youth. Although she was in an environment where zydeco was heard, she took little interest in the music at the time. She first became fascinated with zydeco music when she was 16 years old. She attended a zydeco dance at Richard's, a famous zydeco club in Lawtell, Louisiana, and saw Boozoo Chavis play, which inspired her to start learning to play zydeco. At this dance, she also met Morris Ledet, her husband-to-be.

She learned the accordion watching Morris play. When he heard her, he stepped aside allowing her the spotlight, and became her accompanist on the bass guitar. Morris then brought Rosie to his producer, Mike Lachney, a veteran zydeco producer. Lachney was so impressed that he quickly set up a recording session. Lachney then took Ledet to Floyd Soileau, of the Maison de Soul label. Soileau also was impressed and gave Lachney a contract to produce five albums with Ledet. She started playing around Louisiana and Texas in 1994. The same year, she released her debut album Sweet Brown Sugar on the Maison de Soul label.

She resides in Iota, Louisiana.

Discography
1994 Sweet Brown Sugar (Maison de Soul)
1995 Zesty Zydeco (Maison de Soul)
1997 Zydeco Sensation (Maison de Soul)
1999 I'm a Woman (Maison de Soul)
2000 It's a Groove Thing! (Maison de Soul)
2001 Show Me Something (Maison de Soul)
2003 Now's the Time (Maison de Soul)
2005 Pick It Up (Maison de Soul)
2011 Come Get Some (JSP Records)
2013 Slap Your Mama (JSP Records)

Awards and honors
1995: Best of the Beat Awards, Best Emerging Zydeco Band or Performer
1995: Best of the Beat Awards, Best Zydeco Vocalist
1996: Best of the Beat Awards, Best Emerging Zydeco Band or Performer
1996: Best of the Beat Awards, Best Zydeco Band or Performer
1996: Best of the Beat Awards, Best Zydeco Vocalist

References

External links

Pick It Up: Rosie Ledet LSU Eunice website
Biography on Piedmont Talent

Zydeco accordionists
1971 births
Living people
Louisiana Creole people
American accordionists
Women accordionists
Singers from Louisiana
People from Iota, Louisiana
People from Church Point, Louisiana
21st-century accordionists
21st-century American women musicians
21st-century American singers
21st-century American women singers
Maison de Soul Records artists
JSP Records artists